NK Višnjevac is a Croatian football club based in the village of Višnjevac. The team won the Treća HNL East Division in 2003–04, but did not apply for promotion to the second division.

They won the county cup in 2012 leading to an appearance in the 2012-13 Croatian cup where they lost to Istra 1961 in the 1/16th round.

In 2016, three Korean players joined Višnjevac, and were the target of purchase of a Korean businessman. However they were relegated to the fourth division in 2017.

Honours 

 Treća HNL – East:
Winners (1): 2003–04

References

Football clubs in Croatia
Football clubs in Osijek-Baranja County
Association football clubs established in 1948
1948 establishments in Croatia